Acrocercops hoplocala is a moth of the family Gracillariidae. It is known from New South Wales and Queensland, Australia.

The larvae feed on Eucalyptus botryoides and Eucalyptus robustus. They mine the leaves of their host plant. The mine consists of a short linear mine which soon opens into a roughly circular botch.

References

hoplocala
Moths of Australia
Moths described in 1880